Sandra Mary Caldwell  (born 20 June 1948) is a retired British civil servant. She served as director of field operations for the Health and Safety Executive from 2004 to 2009 and also as deputy chief executive of the HSE from 2008 to 2009. She was appointed Companion of the Order of the Bath (CB) in the 2008 New Year Honours.

References

1948 births
Living people
Companions of the Order of the Bath
Civil servants in the Health and Safety Executive
Alumni of Imperial College London